Ircinia is a genus of sea sponges in the family Irciniidae.

Species
The following 87 species are recognized in the genus Ircinia:

References

Dictyoceratida
Sponge genera
Taxa named by Giovanni Domenico Nardo